Al-Rawda Square ( / ALA-LC: sāḥat ar-Rawḍah) is a square in north-west Damascus. The square is the location of the National Security Building, where the Defence Minister as well as President Bashar al-Assad’s brother-in-law were assassinated On July 18, 2012 during the Syrian civil war.

References

Squares in Damascus